USS Detroit may refer to:

 USS Detroit (1813), a 20-gun ship captured from the British during the Battle of Lake Erie, 10 September 1813, laid up almost immediately, and sold in 1825.
 Detroit, a screw steamer, was laid down at the New York Navy Yard in 1865 but canceled in 1866 and broken up on the stocks
  was a sloop-of-war named so from 15 May to 10 August in 1869. Before and after she was known as the first Canandaigua.
  was a cruiser in use from 1893 to 1904
  was a light cruiser in service from 1923 to 1946
  was a fast combat support ship commissioned in 1970 and decommissioned in 2005
  is a  launched in 2014 and in active service

United States Navy ship names